Arizona Sandsharks was a U.S. indoor soccer team that played in the Continental Indoor Soccer League (CISL).  It was founded in 1992 and folded in 1997, along with the CISL.

Club history
The Sandsharks were founded on August 3, 1992, under the ownership of Jerry Colangelo, owner of the NBA's Phoenix Suns, as a founding member of the Continental Indoor Soccer League. Unfortunately, the 'Sharks were unsuccessful on the turf as the club missed the playoffs in all four of its seasons in the CISL. At the box office, the 'Sharks record was mixed: they did manage higher-than-league average crowds at America West Arena in three of its four seasons, but still only drew 5,331 fans per match. (Summertime indoor soccer proved not to be very lucrative, as the CISL itself averaged only 5,464.)

In 1995, a brawl broke out at a game between the Sandsharks and the visiting Portland Pride, and Arizona's Franklin McIntosh continued the melee into the parking lot. When Colangelo attempted to break up the fight, McIntosh accidentally broke the owner’s nose. This proved to be the breaking point (literally) for Colangelo, who after years of financial losses sought to sell the team. Buyers were found in Kerry Dunne and Brian Weymouth, but the sale was completed just before the 1996 season, so the new owners chose to suspend operations for a year. After another awful season in 1997, though, the Sandsharks withdrew from the CISL; the club was then reorganized and renamed the Arizona Thunder, entering the Premier Soccer Alliance in 1998.

Year-by-year

Coaches
 Peter Duah 1993–1994
 Ron Newman 1995
 Luis Dabo & Petar Baralic 1997

Notable players
 Randy Soderman
 Rick Soderman

Honors
First team All Star
 1994:  Terry Woodberry

References

External links
 CISL yearly standings
 Team profile

Continental Indoor Soccer League teams
Defunct indoor soccer clubs in the United States
Association football clubs established in 1992
Association football clubs disestablished in 1997
Soccer clubs in Arizona
1992 establishments in Arizona
1997 disestablishments in Arizona